Dictyonema is a genus of mainly tropical basidiolichens in the family Hygrophoraceae.

The Dictyonema symbiosis
Most lichens are a symbiosis between an ascomycete fungus and a photosynthetic green alga.  However, a small percentage of lichens (approximately 10%) are cyanolichens and contain a photosynthetic cyanobacterium instead of green algae, and an even smaller number (less than 1%) are basidiolichens and contain a basidiomycete fungus instead of an ascomycete.  This makes Dictyonema more closely related to mushrooms than it is to most other lichens.

Taxonomy and naming
The genus Dictyonema was first named in 1822 by Carl Adgardh and Carl Kunth after examining a novel fungus that was sent to them from Brazil.  The genus was redefined in 1978 when Erast Parmasto assessed  40 different species of basidiolichens that were previously divided into 3 families and 8 genera (including Cora, Dichonema, Laudatea, Rhipidonema, and Thelephora), and reduced them to 5 species in the single genus Dictyonema.  This resulted in a rather diverse group of lichens that has since grown in size to more than 20 species.  There is, however, some recent debate over whether or not all of these species should be included in the same genus.

Species
A recent (2020) estimate placed 28 species in Dictyonema.
Dictyonema aeruginosulum 
Dictyonema album  – Africa
Dictyonema applanatum  – Bolivia
Dictyonema barbatum  – Galápagos Islands
Dictyonema caespitosum 
Dictyonema coppinsii  – Europe
Dictyonema darwinianum  – Galápagos Islands
Dictyonema diducens 
Dictyonema discocarpum  – Bolivia
Dictyonema giganteum 
Dictyonema gomezianum 
Dictyonema guadalupense 
Dictyonema hapteriferum  – Bolivia
Dictyonema hernandezii 
Dictyonema huaorani 
Dictyonema irpicinum 
Dictyonema irrigatum 
Dictyonema krogiae  – Africa
Dictyonema lawreyi 
Dictyonema ligulatum 
Dictyonema metallicum 
Dictyonema moorei 
Dictyonema obscuratum 
Dictyonema pectinatum  – Galápagos Islands
Dictyonema phyllophilum 
Dictyonema ramificans  – Galápagos Islands
Dictyonema reticulatum 
Dictyonema scabridum 
Dictyonema subobscuratum  – Galápagos Islands
Dictyonema thelephora 
Dictyonema tricolor  – Africa
Dictyonema yunnanum

Morphology and ecology
Dictyonema is a diverse group of lichens. There are species of a variety of different shapes, including foliose, crustose, and filamentous. Most species grow on soil, rock, moss, or rotting logs, but one species grows on the leaves of trees.

Evolutionary relationships and lichenization
The Dictyonema fungus is a basidiomycete, so it developed lichenization independently from the ascomycete lichens.  Within the basidiomycetes, Dictyonema is closely related to three other genera of basidiolichens that are also in the family Hygrophoraceae: Lichenomphalia, Acantholichen, and Cyphellostereum. The molecular data indicates that lichenization has evolved independently at least twice, and perhaps three times, within these four genera, which suggests that for some reason the fungi in Hygrophoraceae are predisposed to evolve into lichens.  The majority of the other, non-lichenized fungi in this family are saprotrophic (consuming decaying organic matter) or ectomycorrhizal (symbiotic with plant roots), although numerous species, such as Arrhenia, grow on mosses and derive nutrition from them. It is not yet understood why these fungi are more inclined to become lichens.

Traditional use
An unidentified species of Dictyonema, possibly Dictyonema sericeum, is called nenendape by the Huaorani people of Amazon jungle of Ecuador.  An infusion is made with this lichen that causes intense hallucinations due to high contents in both dimethyltryptamine and psilocybin, and it is used by the shaman to call upon malevolent spirits to curse people.  It is also used to cause sterility.

See also
List of Agaricales genera

References

 
Lichen genera
Agaricales genera
Basidiolichens
Taxa described in 1822